Rob Shaw is an American film director, television director, commercial and music video director, and animator. He is a graduate of University of the Arts (Philadelphia).

Career
In 2006, Rob Shaw joined the animation studio Bent Image Lab, Portland, Oregon, where he began directing commercials, music videos, internet projects, and eventually long and short form television.

In 2007, he directed the music video for the song "I'm Impressed," the debut single from the album "The Else" by the band They Might Be Giants.  The video won a Gold Plaque at the 2008 Chicago International Film Festival (Television Section, Hugo Awards).

In 2008, Shaw directed a second music video for They Might Be Giants for the song "Computer Aided Design". Also in 2008, Shaw was principal director on a series of Bessie Award winning internet shorts for the British Columbia Dairy Association's campaign "Must Drink More Milk."

In 2012, Shaw created the animation Noon Moons for the Experimental Sound Studio, with a soundtrack by Terri Kapsalis and The Eternals.

In 2014, Shaw directed Polariffic, an animated children's television special produced for Hallmark Channel by Bent Image Lab.

In 2018, Rob Shaw joined Bent Image Lab co-founder Chel White for retrospective and masterclass at the Ottawa International Animation Festival.

Awards
The Machine - A modern-day cautionary fable about humans and machines, won Best Animated Short from the 2010 Atlanta Film Festival. The film made its world premiere in the 2009 Anima Mundi festival in Brazil.

Portlandia (TV series) "Rats" stop-motion segments for Independent Film Channel - “Best Television Program for Adults” 2012 Ottawa International Animation Festival.

Polariffic - Hallmark Channel animated children's television special nominated for a 2015 Annie Awards for Best Animated Special.

Commercial Clients
Rob Shaw's commercial clients include Koodo (“El Tabador” 5-year campaign), Gatorade, Hasbro, Cadbury, Alltel, Zune, Guitar Hero, and Kellogg's.

Filmography

Television 
Polariffic (2014)
Portlandia (TV series) "Rats" stop-motion segments for Independent Film Channel(IFC) (2011-2013).
hoops&yoyo's Haunted Halloween (2012)
 Short films
The Machine (2010)

Videography 

 Aesop Rock - Long Legged Larry (2021)
 Aesop Rock - Gates (2020)
Malibu Ken - Corn Maze (2018)
At The Drive-In - Incurably Innocent (2017)
At The Drive-In - Governed By Contagions (2016)
Aesop Rock - Rings (2016)
The Uncluded - Organs (2013)
The Uncluded - Aquarium (2013)
They Might Be Giants - Computer Aided Design (2008)
They Might Be Giants - I'm Impressed (2007)
The Apparitions - God Monkey Robot (2006)

See also
Ladislas Starevich
Jan Švankmajer
Aesop Rock
Portlandia (TV series)

References

American film directors
American animated film directors
American television directors
American animators
Living people
American music video directors
Year of birth missing (living people)
Place of birth missing (living people)